Florian Stępniak, born Józef Stępniak (3 January 1912–29 Sept. 1942) was a former Polish Capuchin friar and Roman Catholic priest. He died in a Nazi concentration camp. He is one of the 108 Martyrs of World War II.

See also 
List of Nazi-German concentration camps
The Holocaust in Poland
World War II casualties of Poland

References

1912 births
1942 deaths
Polish people who died in Dachau concentration camp
108 Blessed Polish Martyrs